The following is a partial list of rivers of Montana (U.S. state).

East of Continental Divide
Water in these rivers flows east and south from the Continental Divide of the Americas, also known as the Great Divide, into the Gulf of Mexico via the Missouri and Mississippi rivers.

Missouri River watershed
Missouri River
Jefferson River
Beaverhead River
Blacktail Deer Creek
Ruby River
Red Rock River
Big Hole River
Wise River
Boulder River
Roe River (one of the shortest rivers in the world)
Madison River
Gallatin River
East Gallatin River
Sixteen Mile Creek
Dearborn River
Smith River
Sun River
Belt Creek
Marias River
Cut Bank Creek
Two Medicine River
Birch Creek
Dupuyer Creek
Teton River
Cottonwood Creek (Liberty County, Montana)
Arrow Creek
Cow Creek
Birch Creek
Judith River
Dry Wolf Creek (Judith Basin County, Montana)
Dry Wolf Creek (Fergus County, Montana)
Musselshell River
Sacagawea River
North Fork Musselshell River
South Fork Musselshell River
Milk River
Big Sandy Creek
Frenchman River
Battle Creek
Redwater River
Poplar River
Big Muddy Creek
Little Muddy Creek
Yellowstone River
Gardner River
DePuy Spring Creek
Shields River
Boulder River
Sweet Grass Creek
Stillwater River
Clarks Fork Yellowstone River
Bighorn River
Beauvais Creek
Big Bull Elk Creek
Black Canyon Creek
Dry Head Creek
Grapevine Creek
Little Bighorn River
Alligator Creek
Lodge Grass Creek
Pass Creek
Reno Creek
Shoulder Blade Creek
West Fork Little Bighorn River
Little Bull Elk Creek
Rotten Grass Creek
Soap Creek
War Man Creek
Woody Creek
Tongue River
Pumpkin Creek
Powder River
Little Powder River
East Fork Little Powder River
Crow Creek
Timber Creek
Spring Creek
Ash Creek
Mizpah Creek
Sheep Creek
Locate Creek
O'Fallon Creek
Cabin Creek
Little Missouri River
Thompson Creek

Laurentian Divide
Waters in these rivers flow north and east from the Laurentian Divide into Hudson Bay, a tributary of the Arctic ocean, via the Saskatchewan and Nelson rivers.
Belly River
St. Mary River
Waterton River

West of Continental Divide
Water in these rivers flow west from the Continental Divide of the Americas into the Pacific ocean via the Columbia river.

Clark Fork River
Bull River
Thompson River
Little Thompson River
Vermilion River
Queer Creek
Flathead River
Jocko River
Little Bitterroot River
Spotted Bear River
White River
Whitefish River
Stillwater River
South Fork Flathead River
Graves Creek
Aeneas Creek
St. Regis River
Bitterroot River
Blackfoot River
Little Blackfoot River
Kootenai River
Yaak River
Fisher River
Ninemile Creek
Tobacco River
Wigwam River
Swan River

Multiple streams with same name
Willow Creek, there are 45 streams named Willow Creek in Montana

See also

Montana Stream Access Law
List of rivers in the United States

External links
Montana Streamflow Data from the USGS
Montana Watershed Data From Environmental Protection Agency
Montana River Action
National River Management Organization

Montana
 
Rivers